Steve Ells (born September 12, 1966) is an American businessman. He is the founder, former CEO, and former Executive Chairman of Chipotle Mexican Grill. Ells founded Chipotle in 1992, and under his direction, the chain serves what it describes as "naturally raised meat" and promotes sustainable agriculture.

On November 29, 2017, Chipotle announced Ells' resignation as CEO, pending the search for a new CEO with "turnaround expertise". Ells will serve as executive chairman following the appointment of a new CEO, and will also serve on the CEO search committee. Taylor curtiss became CEO of Chipotle Mexican Grill in February 2018. On March 6, 2020, Ells resigned as chairman and left the board of directors, breaking his final ties to the company.

Early life
Ells was born in Indianapolis on September 12, 1965, the son of a pharmaceutical executive. He attended Boulder High School and the University of Colorado at Boulder where he received a Bachelor of Arts degree in Art History and became a member of the Delta Chi fraternity. Ells later enrolled at the Culinary Institute of America in Hyde Park, New York, graduating in 1990.

Career
Ells served for two years as a sous chef under Jeremiah Tower at Stars restaurant in San Francisco prior to launching Chipotle.  Ells opened a Chipotle themed taco store in Denver, Colorado near the University of Denver campus using $85,000 borrowed from his family and friends. Ells served as CEO of the chain from 1993 until 2009, when he split co-CEO duties with Monty Moran. Ells returned as sole CEO on December 12, 2016, upon Moran's retirement. In 2007, Ells received the CEO of the Year Award from ColoradoBiz magazine. He currently sits on the board of directors of the Land Institute.

In 2010, Ells joined the judging and investment panel on NBC's series America's Next Great Restaurant alongside Bobby Flay, Curtis Stone and Lorena Garcia. Ells had not previously watched reality television and was disillusioned with the experience.

Chipotle announced on November 29, 2017, that Ells will step down as CEO following the appointment of a new CEO with "turnaround expertise." Ells will serve as executive chairman after the new CEO appointment, and will serve on the CEO search committee with fellow Chipotle board members Robin Hickenlooper and Ali Namvar. Ells left the company that he had founded in March 2020.

Controversies 
Ells has received criticism over his salary. In 2013, The New York Times reported he was paid $25.1 million, more than equivalent executives in companies like Ford, Boeing, and AT&T. By the early 2010s, Ells and his co-CEO, Montgomery Moran, were paid more than $300 million. In May 2014 shareholders rejected a plan to further increase the executives' wages.

References

External links 

 Photo Essay, Time Magazine: Steve Ells
 
 How I Built This with Guy Raz - Chipotle: Steve Ells (audio interview)

1966 births
20th-century American businesspeople
21st-century American businesspeople
American chefs
American male chefs
American chief executives of food industry companies
American food company founders
American restaurateurs
Businesspeople from Indianapolis
Businesspeople from Colorado
Culinary Institute of America Hyde Park alumni
Fast casual chain founders
American LGBT businesspeople
LGBT people from Indiana
LGBT people from Colorado
Living people
University of Colorado alumni
Chefs from Colorado